Grinder Island is one of the ice-covered islands in the Marshall Archipelago, located within the Sulzberger Ice Shelf off the coast of Marie Byrd Land, Antarctica. It was mapped by the United States Geological Survey from surveys and U.S. Navy air photos, 1959–65, and was named by the Advisory Committee on Antarctic Names for Harry W. Grinder, a U.S. Navy aviation structural mechanic of McMurdo Station, 1967.

See also 
 List of Antarctic and sub-Antarctic islands

References

Islands of Marie Byrd Land